Llameiru (Llamero in Spanish) is one of eleven parishes (administrative divisions)  in Candamo, a municipality within the province and autonomous community of Asturias, in northern Spain. 

Villages
 El Monte Pop. 2011 - 10
 Ferreiros Pop. 2011 - 67
 Llameiru Pop. 2011 - 127
 Villanueva Pop. 2011 - 24

References  

Parishes in Candamo